Body Slam is a 1986 American comedy film directed by Hal Needham and starring Dirk Benedict, Roddy Piper, Tanya Roberts, Sam Fatu, and Captain Lou Albano. The film revolves around a down-and-out music promoter who inadvertently becomes a successful professional wrestling manager. After being exiled from the business by a rival manager, he finds success in promoting shows that feature both wrestling and rock music. The film features many well-known wrestlers of the time and references the Rock 'n' Wrestling era of professional wrestling.

Hal Needham had arguments with the pair that produced and wrote the film regarding his changes to the script, resulting in lawsuits that delayed the film's release. As a result, the film was never theatrically released and was instead released direct-to-video. It was Needham's final theatrical film.

Plot 
M. Harry Smilac (Dirk Benedict), once a successful  music promoter, is having a hard time attracting talent and booking gigs for his sole client, the rock band Kick. Behind on his car payments and owing a large amount to a banker, he reluctantly accepts a job finding musical acts for the fundraiser of an unpopular politician. Although not entirely happy with his new gig, Smilac finds a love interest in Candace Vandervagen (Tanya Roberts), the daughter of the politician's wealthy campaign booster.

While making arrangements for the fundraiser, Smilac mistakes pro wrestler "Quick" Rick Roberts (Roddy Piper) for a musician and hires him. Having zero luck as a music manager, Smilac decides to stick with his hunch about Roberts and become a pro wrestling manager, booking matches for Roberts and his teammate Tonga Tom (Sam Fatu). The team is a success but politics come into play when Smilac clashes with Rick's former manager, the villainous Captain Lou Murano (Lou Albano). A day after a disastrous fundraiser featuring Smilac's rock band, Murano and his tag team champions The Cannibals (Sione Vailahi and Tom Cassett) injure Harry and his wrestlers in a nationally televised bout, before blacklisting them from every major arena in the country.

Recovering from their injuries and on the fringes of both the music and wrestling industries, Harry decides to take his wrestlers and his band on a cross country road tour of small arenas. Initially he promotes separate wrestling and rock shows, but a scheduling mix-up at a venue causes him to promote a single event featuring both music and wrestling. The show is well received and Smilac schedules an entire tour using the same "Rock n' Wrestling" format. Their tour is a huge success, which angers Captain Lou Murano.  On a televised appearance, Harry challenges Captain Lou's Cannibals to a match for the World Tag Team Championships on behalf of his wrestlers Rick Roberts and Tonga Tom.  After a hard fought match, Rick and Tom have beaten the Cannibals to win the title belts and become the new champions.

Cast
 Dirk Benedict as M. Harry Smilac. He was Needham's first choice for the role based on Benedict's work on the television show The A-Team. Although Benedict had previously worked with professional wrestler Hulk Hogan on an episode of The A-Team, Benedict only found out about the scripted nature of professional wrestling through his work on this film.
 Roddy Piper as Rick "Quick Rick" Roberts. Piper was best known for his work with the World Wrestling Federation. He would go on to star in other films such as Hell Comes to Frogtown and John Carpenter's They Live. 
 Sam Fatu as Tonga Tom. Fatu is a member of wrestling's famed Anoa'i family. His most well known ring name is The Tonga Kid.
 Kellie Martin as Missy Roberts. Several years after starring in the movie, a 14-year-old Martin mentioned that the film never made it to theaters and called it "kind of a flop." 
 Tanya Roberts as Candace Vandervagen
 Captain Lou Albano as Captain Lou Murano. Albano was already a well-known wrestling manager and veteran of the wrestling business when he played the role in the film.
 Afa Anoa'i and Sika Anoa'i as The Samoans. Like Fatu, both are members of the Anoa'i family. The two star as bodyguards in the film in non-speaking roles. However, they also had successful real life wrestling careers as the tag team The Wild Samoans, with Lou Albano as their manager. The duo was inducted into the WWE Hall of Fame in 2007.
 Sione Vailahi and Thomas Leroy Kasat as "Axe" and "Hammer" The Cannibals. Both were professional wrestlers, and infrequently teamed for Jim Crockett Promotions house shows in 1986. Vailahi is best known for his work in World Wrestling Federation and World Championship Wrestling as The Barbarian. The duo staged a real fight with Piper and Fatu during the filming of the movie's final match so the crowd of extras would take them seriously.
 Charles Nelson Reilly as Vic Carson. Reilly had previously starred in another Hal Needham film, Cannonball Run II. 
 Billy Barty as Tim McClusky
 John Astin as Scotty, The Car Dealer
 John Fujioka as Mr. Kim
 Wrestling personalities Ric Flair, Freddie Blassie, Adnan Al-Kaissie, Bruno Sammartino and Alexis Smirnoff appear in cameos as audience members during the film's final match.

Production and release
In an interview with Canadian Online Explorer, Dirk Benedict recounts positive experiences working on the film. However, both he and director Hal Needham clashed with the two lawyers credited with writing and producing the film over changes to the script and Needham's creative choices. At one point, Benedict had a physical altercation with one of the writers/producers. These conflicts led to lawsuits being filed, which caused the film to miss the entire summer movie season. Later, the film was slated to be released by Hemdale Film Corporation in November 1986. The film never saw wide theatrical release and was instead released directly to VHS. On March 15, 2011, Body Slam was brought to DVD as part of the MGM Limited Edition Collection series.

Reception
The film was met with mixed reviews. TV Guide rated it at two stars, describing it as a "raucous action comedy with a certain (admittedly dubious) historical appeal." Mick Martin and Marsha Porter also gave it two stars, calling the film "silly" but saying that it had "a lot of heart." Leonard Maltin gave the film two-and-a-half stars, calling Dirk Benedict's performance "charming" and lamenting that the film was not widely released, saying that it "deserved better." Variety gave the film a positive review, calling it a "pleasant surprise" and "genuinely funny." They praised Dirk Benedict's performance and called the film a "solid comeback" for director Hal Needham.

References

External links
 
 
 

1986 direct-to-video films
1986 films
1986 comedy films
Professional wrestling films
Orion Pictures films
American comedy films
Films directed by Hal Needham
1980s English-language films
1980s American films